Günbulur, historically Keferbostan, is a village in the Şehitkamil District, Gaziantep Province, Turkey. The village is inhabited by non-tribal Turks.

References

Villages in Şehitkamil District